This list ranks metropolitan areas in Oceania by their population; it includes metropolitan areas that have a population of over 100,000 people.

Sources and definitions
Metropolitan areas are listed as defined by their jurisdiction. 

For Australia, metropolitan areas are defined as per the Greater Capital City Statistical Area (GCCSA) or Significant Urban Area (SUA) designations of the Australian Statistical Geography Standard (ASGS), as appropriate.

For New Zealand, metropolitan areas are defined as per the Functional Urban Area (FUA) classification and population statistics are sourced from the Statistics New Zealand Population estimates and projections.

For the United States, metropolitan areas are defined as per the Metropolitan Statistical Area (MSA) as defined by The United States Office of Management and Budget.

Metropolitan areas

See also
 List of cities in Oceania by population
 Lists of cities in Oceania

References

Lists of metropolitan areas in Asia Pacific
Metropolitan areas of Oceania